General elections were held in Papua and New Guinea on 27 August 1960.

Electoral system
The 29-member Legislative Council consisted of the Administrator, 16 civil servants, nine members appointed by the Administrator (three representatives of the indigenous population, three representing European settlers and three representing missionaries) and three elected Europeans. The Chinese community were also given the right to vote alongside Europeans.

The three elected members were elected from three single-member constituencies, New Guinea Islands, New Guinea Mainland and Papua by preferential voting.

Campaign
Two of the three seats were uncontested, with Craig Kirke, a Port Moresby solicitor and anti-income tax activist running unopposed in Papua and former MLC Don Barrett, a planter, the sole candidate in New Guinea Islands. The New Guinea Mainland seat was contested by former MLC Sydney Barker (a dentist and miner from Wau), Paul Hymna (an accountant from Lae), Lloyd Hurrell (a farmer in Wau) and Keith Watkins (a trader from Lae).

Results
In the sole contested constituency, voter turnout was around 38%.

Appointed members
Reuben Taureka was appointed as an official member, replacing the Director of Native Affairs, becoming the first official indigenous member.

References

Elections in Papua New Guinea
Papua
1960 in Papua New Guinea
Politics of Papua and New Guinea
August 1960 events in Oceania
Election and referendum articles with incomplete results